Olfactory receptor, family 6, subfamily C, member 75 is a protein in humans that is encoded by the OR6C75 gene.

Olfactory receptors interact with odorant molecules in the nose to initiate a neuronal response that triggers the perception of a smell. The olfactory receptor proteins are members of a large family of G-protein-coupled receptors (GPCR) arising from single coding-exon genes. Olfactory receptors share a 7-transmembrane domain structure with many neurotransmitter receptors and hormone receptors and are responsible for the recognition and G protein-mediated transduction of odorant signals. The olfactory receptor gene family is the largest in the genome. The nomenclature assigned to the olfactory receptor genes and proteins for this organism is independent of other organisms.

References

Further reading 

Human proteins
Olfactory receptors